A Six Pack of Judd is a six-song EP compact disc recorded by country music parodist Cledus T. Judd. It was released in 2003 on Monument Records Nashville.

The beer can depicted on the album cover gives a nod to Budweiser's "Born on Date" concept, using the album's release date ("29 APR 2003").

Track listing
"Where's Your Mommy?"
parody of "Who's Your Daddy?" by Toby Keith
"I Was Country When Country Wasn't Pop"
parody of "I Was Country When Country Wasn't Cool" by Barbara Mandrell and George Jones
feat. George Jones
"My Crowd"
parody of "My Town" by Montgomery Gentry
"270 Somethin'"
parody of "19 Somethin'" by Mark Wills
"Riding with Inmate Jerome"
parody of "Riding with Private Malone" by David Ball
"New Car"
parody of "Big Star" by Kenny Chesney

Chart performance

Cledus T. Judd albums
2003 EPs
Monument Records EPs
Comedy EPs
2000s comedy albums